Gaffiot is a French surname, and may refer to:
 Félix Gaffiot (1870–1937), French philologist and teacher
 Dictionnaire Illustré Latin-Français, a 1934 dictionary of Latin, described in French, compiled by Félix Gaffiot, and commonly eponymised for him